1337 or variation, may refer to:

 1337 (number), a number in the thousands range

Dates
 1337 AD (MCCCXXXVII), a year of the Common Era (CE)
 1337 BC, a year from the era Before the Common Era (BCE)

Legislation
 United Nations Security Council Resolution 1337
 U.S. federal H.R. 1337, legalizing homebrewing

Military
 No. 1337 Wing RAF Regiment, UK Royal Air Force unit
 , U.S. Coast Guard cutter, pennant 1337

Places
 1337 Gerarda, a main-belt asteroid, 1337th asteroid registered
 NGC 1337, a spiral galaxy in Eridanus
 IC 1337, a spiral galaxy in Capricornus
 Road 1337, see List of Farm to Market Roads in Texas (1300–1399)

Other uses
 1337 sp33k (1337; elite; leet-speak), a spelling convention used by some in computing forums
 1337 Magazine
 1337 (character), a fictional character, a SPARTAN-II soldier from Halo Legends
 AT&T Model 1337, the first digital answering machine
 1337-class train, used for the Valley Flyer

See also

 
 137 (disambiguation)